Nomagawa Dam  is a gravity dam located in Hiroshima Prefecture in Japan. The dam is used for flood control and water supply. The catchment area of the dam is 4.4 km2. The dam impounds about 6  ha of land when full and can store 560 thousand cubic meters of water. The construction of the dam was started on 1988 and completed in 2012.

References

Dams in Hiroshima Prefecture